Decamethylzirconocene dichloride is an organozirconium compound with the formula Cp*2ZrCl2 (where Cp* is C5(CH3)5, derived from pentamethylcyclopentadiene).  It is a pale yellow, moisture sensitive solid that is soluble in nonpolar organic solvents.  The complex has been the subject of extensive research.  It is a precursor to many other complexes, including the dinitrogen complex [Cp*2Zr]2(N2)3).  It is a precatalyst for the polymerization of ethylene and propylene.

Further reading

References

Organozirconium compounds
Metallocenes
Metal halides
Chloro complexes
Cyclopentadienyl complexes
Zirconium(IV) compounds